The Khok Kruat Formation is a rock formation found in northeastern Thailand. It is the uppermost formation of the Khorat Group. It is dated to the Aptian stage of the Early Cretaceous period, and is notable for its fossils of dinosaurs. It is equivalent to the Gres superieurs Formation of Laos. The group is a fluvial formation consisting primarily of red siltstones and sandstones.

Vertebrate paleofauna 

The Khok Kruat Formation has yielded remains of sharks, fishes, turtles, crocodilians and pterosaurs. Phuwiangosaurus-like teeth, Siamosaurus teeth, and fragmentary postcranial remains of spinosaurids have also been recovered from it. Fukuiraptor-like teeth have also been recovered from the formation.

Reptiles

Dinosaurs

Pseudosuchians

Turtles

Fish

Bony fish

Cartilaginous fish

See also 
 List of dinosaur-bearing rock formations

References 

Geologic formations of Thailand
Lower Cretaceous Series of Asia
Cretaceous Thailand
Aptian Stage
Sandstone formations
Siltstone formations
Paleontology in Thailand